A Vorpostenboot (plural Vorpostenboote) was an auxiliary warship used by Germany in both World Wars. Many vorpostenboote also served in other roles, such as sperrbrecher (mine clearance) and weather ships. During World War II, the Vorpostenboote were organized into several surface flotillas which were in turn attached to various German ports. Over 30 Vorpostenflotillas were established to operate off the German, Channel, Baltic and Scandinavian coasts.

1 Vorpostenflotille
1 Vorpostenflotille was active in the western Baltic from 1 October 1939 to 1 October 1940, when it was redesignated 3 Sperrbrecherflotille.

2 Vorpostenflotille
2 Vorpostenflotille existed from September 1939 to December 1944, when it was disbanded. Many vessels were redesignated within the unit, later designations are shown in brackets

3 Vorpostenflotille
3 Vorpostenflotille was established in September 1939.

4 Vorpostenflotille
4 Vorpostenflotille was formed in September 1939 and was disbanded in September 1944. Many vessels were re-designated within the unit. Later designations are shown in brackets.

5 Vorpostengruppe
5 Vorpostengruppe was established in September 1939 and disbanded on 22 May 1940.

6 Vorpostengruppe
6 Vorpostengruppe was established in September 1939 and disbanded on 22 May 1940.

6 Vorpostenflotille
6 Vorpostenflotille was established on 1 January 1943 and disbanded in September 1944.

7 Vorpostenflotille
7 Vorpostenflotille was established on 22 September 1939. It was disbanded in September 1944.

8 Vorpostenflotille
8 Vorpostenflotille was formed in September 1939 and disbanded in 1945. One vessel was redesignated within the unit.

9 Vorpostenflotille
9 Vorpostenflotille was established on 27 September 1939. It was disbanded on 23 April 1945.

10 Vorpostenflotille
10 Vorpostenflotille was established in September 1939. It was renamed 10 Sicherungsflottille on 1 October 1943.

11 Vorpostenflotille
11 Vorpostenflotille was formed in September 1939. A few vessels were redesignated within the unit.

12 Vorpostenflotille
12 Vorpostenflotille was formed on 26 September 1939. It was disbanded in December 1947.

V 1225
V 1226
V 1227
V 1228
V 1229
V 1230
V 1231 Toni
V 1232 Elise
V 1233 Vooruit †
V 1234 Koningin Emma
V 1235 Columbus
V 1236 'Flevo III †
V 1236 Augusta †
V 1237 Notre Dame de Dunes †
V 1238 Voorloper
V 1239 Vooran
V 1240 Therese
V 1241 Stangenwalde †
V 1242 Marie Henriette
V 1243 Hohenstein
V 1244
V 1245
V 1246
V 1247
V 1248
V 1249 Mewa VIII †
V 1250 †
V 1251
V 1252 †
V 1253 Essen
V 1254 Hermann Garrels †
V 1255 Ernst Hecht †
V 1256 Heinrich Onnen †
V 1256
V 1257
V 1258
V 1259
V 1260 Gebroeders
V 1261 Vooruit
V 1262 Verwachting †
V 1263
V 1264
V 1265 Dr. Eichelbaum
V 1265
V 1266
V 1267
V 1268
V 1269 †
V 1270
V 1271
V 1272
V 1273
V 1274

Losses
V 1201 Juno struck a mine in the North Sea west of Heligoland. She was then attacked and sunk by an Allied de Havilland Mosquito aircraft on 17 September 1944. 
V 1202 Friedrich Suthmeier struck a mine in the North Sea west of Heligoland. She was then attacked and sunk by an Allied de Havilland Mosquito aircraft on 17 September 1944.
V 1207 P. von Rensen was bombed and sunk in the North Sea off Heligoland by Allied aircraft on 17 April 1945. 
V 1214 Joannes Georgius struck a mine and sank in the North Sea off Sylt, Schleswig-Holstein on 27 September 1944. 
V 1233 Vooruit was sunk in the North Sea by British aircraft on 18 April 1944. 
V 1236 Flevo III struck a mine and sank on 11 July 1942. 
V 1236 Augusta was sunk in the North Sea by British aircraft on 18 April 1944. 
V 1237 Notre Dame de Dunes was sunk in the North Sea by British aircraft on 18 April 1944. 
V 1241 Stangenwalde was sunk in the North Sea off Terschelling, Friesland, Netherlands in a battle with British motor gun boats and motor torpedo boats (MGB 605, MGB 606, MGB 610, MGB 612, MTB 624, MTB 630 and MTB 632) on 1 May 1943. 
V 1249 Mewa VIII struck a mine and sank in the North Sea off Borkum, Lower Saxony on 24 February 1943. 
V 1250 was sunk in an Allied air raid on Wesermünde, Bremen on 2 June 1944. 
V 1252 collided with the flakship  and sank in the North Sea off Borkum on 4 April 1943. 
V 1254 Hermann Garrels was torpedoed and sunk in the North Sea off Terschelling by a Royal Navy Motor Torpedo Boat on 5 July 1944. 
V 1255 Ernst Hecht ran aground and was wrecked on 4 January 1945. 
V 1256 Hinrich Onnen was sunk by an Allied aircraft, either with bombs or torpedoes, off Terschelling on 5 July 1945. 
V 1262 Verwachting in 1944. 
V 1269 struck a mine and sank in the North Sea west of Esbjerg, Denmark on 27 August 1944.

13 Vorpostenflotille
13 Vorpostenflotille was established in September 1939. It was disbanded in January 1945.

V 1300 Stoomloodsvartuig 17
V 1301 Uranus
V 1302 John Mahn – bombed and sunk in the English Channel by Royal Air Force aircraft on 12 February 1942. 
V 1303 Freiburg  –  sunk in the North Sea off Hook of Holland, South Holland, Netherlands by vessels of the 4th MTB Flotilla, RN on 9 October 1944.
V 1304 Eisenach – sunk in the North Sea off IJmuiden, North Holland, Netherlands by MTBs 224, 225, 232, 234,241 and 244 on 6 March 1944. 
V 1305 Wuppertal
V 1306 Otto Krogmann
V 1308 Bredebeck – sunk in the North Sea in a battle with MTB 434 and other vessels of the 54th MTB flotilla on 9 July 1944. 
V 1309 Kapitän Stemmer – collided with V 811 Hugo Homann and sank in the North Sea off Hook of Holland on 28 February 1944. 
V 1310 Deister
V 1310 Gotland
V 1311 Döse – torpedoed and sunk in the North Sea off Hook of Holland by Royal Navy Motor Torpedo Boats on 11 May 1944. 
V 1312 Hermann Siebert
V 1313 Uran
V 1314 Gustav Hugo Deiters –  sunk in the North Sea off Den Helder, North Holland by MTBs 666, 682, 681, 683, 684, 687 and 723 on 9 June 1944. 
V 1315 Karlsburg
V 1316 Emil Colsmann
V 1317 Wilhelm Michaelsen
V 1318 Hans Pickenpack  – struck a mine and sank in the North Sea off Vlieland, Friesland, Netherlands on 27 February 1943.
V 1330 Cyclop
V 1331 Limburgia
V 1332 Norma Maria
V 1333 Zeemeeuw
V 1334 Witte Zee
V 1335 Adelante
V 1336 J. S. Groen
V 1337 Irene
V 1337 Victoire
V 1338 Azimuth
V 1339 Stoomloodsvartuig 12
V 1340 Delft  – was bombed and sunk at Noordwijk, North Holland on 27 November 1943.

14 Vorpostenflotille
14 Vorpostenflotille was established on 1 February 1943 and disbanded in 1945.

V 1401 Deister †
V 1402 Hermann Siebert
V 1403 B 1687
V 1403 Simone Marie
V 1404 B 1557
V 1404 Christiane Cécile
V 1405 Ritzebüttel †
V 1406 Frankfurt
V 1407 Kurland
V 1408 Aue ZRD 16 † 
V 1408 Cyclop
V 1409 IJM 54
V 1409 Limburgia †
V 1410 IJM 6
V 1410 Norma Maria
V 1411 ZRD 19
V 1411 Zeemeeuw †
V 1412 Witte Zee
V 1413 IJM 19
V 1413 Adelante
V 1414 IJM 130
V 1414 J. S. Groen
V 1415 IJM 195
V 1415 Azimuth †
V 1416 IJM 89 †
V 1416 Irene
V 1417 Stoomloodsvartuig 11 †
V 1418 Frans Naerebout
V 1419 Victoire
V 1420 B 339
V 1420 Saint Joachim
V 1421 Deltra II
V 1422 B 1402
V 1422 Michel François
V 1423 B 3059
V 1423 Emmanuella
V 1424 Le Cid
V 1425 LR 3306
V 1425 Banderole
V 1426 Antoinette

† Losses:- V 1401 Deister suffered a boiler explosion and sank in the North Sea off IJmuiden, North Holland, Netherlands on 26 April 1944; a vessel designated V 1401 was bombed and sunk at IJmuiden on 24 August 1944. V 1405 Ritzebüttel (as V 2008 Ritzebüttel) struck a mine and sank in the Broad Fourteens off Westkapelle, West Flanders, Belgium on 25 February 1943. Ten crew were killed. V 1408 Aue was torpedoed and sunk in the North Sea off IJmuiden by Bristol Beaufighter aircraft of the Royal Air Force on 29 April 1943. V 1411 Zeemeeuw sank in the North Sea off IJmuiden on 5 July 1944. V 1415 Azimuth on 26 March 1944. V 1416 was sunk at IJmuiden by Martin B-26 Marauder aircraft of the United States Eighth Air Force. V 1417 Stoomloodsvartuig 11 was sunk in the North Sea off Terschelling, Friesland, Netherlands by British aircraft on 17 January 1945.

15 Vorpostenflotille
15 Vorpostenflotille was formed in September 1939. It was disbanded in 1945.

The unit also operated these s captured whilst under construction in France.

16 Vorpostengruppe 
16 Vorpostengruppe was formed in July 1940. It was redesignated 16 Vorpostenflotille on 20 September 1940.

16 Vorpostenflotille
16 Vorpostenflotille was formed on 20 September 1940. It was disbanded in July 1945.

17 Vorpostenflotille
17 Vorpostenflotille was formed in June 1940. It was disbanded in 1945.

18 Vorpostengruppe
18 Vorpostengruppe was formed in July 1940. It was redesignated 18 Vorpostenflotille on 3 October 1940.

18 Vorpostenflotille
18 Vorpostenflotille was formed on 3 October 1940. It was disbanded in 1945.

V 1801 Lutteur †
V 1801 Wandrahm
V 1802 Orient †
V 1803 Le Havre de Grace
V 1804 Excellent
V 1805 Senateur Louis Brindeau †
V 1806 Surmulet
V 1807 Wagram †
V 1808 Dortmund †
V 1809 Henry P. Newman
V 1810 Condor †
V 1811 Sylt
V 1812 Halle
V 1813 Thotn
V 1814 Linz †
V 1815 Loodsboot 6 †
V 1816 Dauphine
V 1817 Eglantine

†Losses:- V 1801 Lutteur was named O 22 S when she sank in December 1941. She was subsequently salvaged and repaired. She was sunk in an Allied air raid on Kiel, Schleswig-Holstein on 12 April 1944 but was salvaged in December 1944, repaired and returned to service. V 1802 Orient was sunk in the Baltic Sea off Memel, East Prussia by Soviet aircraft on 11 November 1944. V 1805 Senateur Louis Brindeau was sunk in an Allied air raid on Le Havre, Seine-Maritime, France on 15 June 1944. V 1807 Wagram struck a mine and sank on 14 August 1942. V 1808 Dortmund struck a mine and sank in the Broad Fourteens on 23 May 1942. V 1810 Condor was bombed and sunk in the English Channel off Boulogne, Pas-de-Calais, France on 2 June 1944. V 1814 Linz was sunk in an Allied air raid on Boulogne on 16 June 1944. V 1815 Loodsboot 6 was sunk in an Allied air rain on Boulogne on 16 June 1944.

19 Vorpostenflotille
19 Vorpostenflotille was formed in July 1940. It was redesignated 5 Sicherungsflotille on 1 October 1943. One vessel was redesignated within the unit.

20 Vorpostenflotille
20 Vorpostenflotille was formed in July 1940. It was renamed 20 Minensuchflotille post-war.

V 2001 Pastor Pype †
V 2001 Uranus †
V 2002 Madeleine Louise †
V 2002 Uran
V 2003 Loodsboot 7 †
V 2004 Loodsboot 12 †
V 2005 Simone Marie
V 2006 Christine Cécile
V 2007 Hannover
V 2008 Ritzebüttel †
V 2009 Niedersachsen †
V 2010 Frankfurt
V 2011 Borkum
V 2012 Kurland
V 2013 Ekwator
V 2014 Karel
V 2015
V 2016 †
V 2017
V 2018 Vogtland
V 2019 Seefahrt (later named Adolf Hitler) †
V 2020 Alexander Becker †
V 2021 Nürnberg †
V 2022 Emil Colsmann †
V 2023 Karlsburg †

† Losses:- V 2001 Pastor Pype was wrecked in the Wadden Sea on 5 March 1942. All 28 crew were rescued. V 2001 Uranus was sunk in the Baltic Sea by Soviet aircraft on 2 May 1945. V 2002 Madeleine Louise was bombed and sunk in the North Sea off Terschelling, Friesland, Netherlands by Lockheed Hudson aircraft of 407 Squadron, Royal Air Force on 15 May 1942. V 2003 Loodsboot 7 was torpedoed and sunk in the North Sea off Terschelling by Royal Navy Motor Gun Boats and Motor Torpedo Boats on 1 October 1942. V 2004 Loodsboot 12 was torpedoed and sunk in the North Sea off IJmuiden, North Holland, Netherlands by a Motor Torpedo Boat on 2 June 1944. V 2008 Ritzebüttel struck a mine and sank in the Broad Fourteens off Westkapelle, West Flanders, Belgium on 25 February 1943. V 2009 Niedersachsen was sunk in the Scheldt by Royal Navy Motor Torpedo Boats on 25 August 1944. V 2016 was sunk in the North Sea by Royal Navy Motor Torpedo Boats on 16 October 1944. V 2018 Vogtland struck a mine and was damaged in the North Sea off Terschelling on 28 March 1943. She was taken in tow by V 801 Max Gundelach but struck another mine the next day and sank with the loss of four of her crew. V 2019 Adolf Hitler was bombed and severely damaged in the Scheldt on 28 June 1943 and was beached. V 2020 Alexander Becker was torpedoed and sunk in the North Sea off Egmond aan Zee, North Holland by Royal Navy Motor Torpedo Boats on 10 June 1944. V 2023 Karlsburg was sunk in an American air raid on Swinemünde, Pomerania on 12 March 1945.

51 Vorpostenflotille
51 Vorpostenflotille was formed on 23 December 1940. It was disbanded in June 1945. A number of vessels were redesignated within the unit.

V 5101 Donner (V 5102) †
V 5101 Tornado (V 5105, V 5106)
V 5101 Blitz (V 5102, V 5103) †
V 5102 Orkan (V 5103, V 5104)
V 5103 Taifun (V 5105, V 5106) †
V 5103 Riese
V 5104 Wirbel (V 5105)
V 5106 Sturm (V 5107) †,‡
V 5106 Sindbad
V 5107 Sturm †,‡‡
V 5107 Kormoran
V 5107 Karmöy
V 5108 Föhn†
V 5108 Kiebitz
V 5109 Kranich
V 5109 Eber
V 5110 Marabu
V 5110 Elch
V 5111 Odin
V 5112 Tiu
V 5113 Donar
V 5114 Baldur
V 5115 Frija
V 5116 Unitas 1

† Losses:- V 5101 Blitz was torpedoed and sunk in Nordfjord by Royal Air Force aircraft on 12 December 1944. V 5103 Taifun collided with the Norwegian coaster  and sank on 9 August 1942. V 5106 Sturm was sunk in a naval battle on 11 February 1944.
‡ Formerly named Hareidingen.
‡‡ Formerly named Aalesund.

53 Vorpostenflotille
53 Vorpostenflotille was formed on 23 December 1940. It was disbanded in June 1945. A number of vessels were redesignated within the unit.

V 5301 Flamingo (V 5305)
V 5301 Reiher (V 5302)
V 5301 Seeteufel
V 5302 Kranich (V 5303)
V 5302 Seelöwe
V 5303 Marabu (V 5306)
V 5303 Sturmvogel
V 5303 Seebär
V 5304 Kormoran (V 5307)
V 5304 Kiebetz (V 5307)
V 5304 Seehund
V 5305 Schnepfe (V 5308)
V 5305 Jäger
V 5306 Brachvogel (V 5308) ‡
V 5306 Schütze
V 5307 Felix Scheder †
V 5308 O. B. Rogge
V 5309 Seerobbe
V 5310 Seewolf
V 5311 Seeotter †
V 5312 Brachvogel ‡‡
V 5313 Star XXIII

† Losses:- V 5304 was sunk at Lervik, Østfold, Norway by de Havilland Mosquito aircraft of 143 Squadron, Royal Air Force on 15 January 1945. V 5311 Seeotter struck a mine and sank off "Gejta", Norway on 5 July 1945 with the loss of 23 of her crew.‡Formerly named Jim.Formerly named Pol VIII.

55 Vorpostenflotille
55 Vorpostenflotille was formed in December 1940. It was disbanded in June 1945. A number of vessels were redesignated within the unit.

V 5501 Bussard
V 5501 Zick (V 5503, V 5506) †
V 5501 Ratte
V 5501 Seeteufel (V 5505, V 5515)
V 5502 Sperber
V 5502 M253
V 5502 Zack (V 5504)
V 5502 Biber †
V 5502 KFK1
V 5502 Snøgg †
V 5503 Habicht
V 5503 Otter
V 5504 Sperber
V 5504 S12
V 5504 Marder
V 5505 Adler
V 5505 Wiesel
V 5506 Rabe
V 5506 Felix Scheder
V 5506 KFK332
V 5507 Krähe
V 5507 O. B. Rogge
V 5507 S10
V 5507 Bisam
V 5508 Elster
V 5508 Seelöwe
V 5508 Frettchen
V 5509 S14
V 5509 Murmel
V 5510 S15 (V 5511)
V 5510 S13
V 5510 Marabu
V 5511 S16 (V 5512)
V 5511 Moskito
V 5512 Grenadier
V 5513 Libelle
V 5514 Hornisse
V 5515 Ulan
V 5516 Flamingo
V 5517 Natter
V 5518 Reiher
V 5519 Tarantel
V 5520 Adler
V 5525 †
V 5531 †

† Losses:- V 5502 Biber was sunk in Hjeltefjorden by Bristol Beaufighter and de Havilland Mosquito aircraft of the Banff Strike Wing, Royal Air Force on 24 September 1944. V 5502 Snøgg ran aground on the Norwegian coast on 1 September 1943. She sank on 6 September during salvage attempts. V 5506 Zick was sunk in Hjeltefjord by de Havilland Mosquito aircraft of 235 and 248 Squadrons, Royal Air Force on 23 October 1944.

57 Vorpostenflotille
57 Vorpostenflotille was formed in November 1940. It was disbanded in June 1945. A number of vessels were redesignated within the unit.

V 5701 Thüringen
V 5702 Eupen (V 5706)
V 5702 Grane
V 5703 Elsass (V 5705)
V 5703 Lothringen (V 5704)
V 5704 Warthegau ( V 5705)
V 5705 Elsaß †
V 5706 Ostmark †
V 5707 Südwind
V 5711 Steiermark
V 5712 Kärnten
V 5713 Sudetenland
V 5714 Tirol
V 5715 Skaggerak
V 5716 Flandern
V 5717 Fritz Homann
V 5718 Coburg †
V 5719 Markomanne
V 5720 Normanne
V 5721 Turinge
V 5722 Hornack †
V 5723 Möwe

†Losses:- V 5705 Elsaß struck a mine and sank in the Norwegian Sea off Bodø, Nordland, Norway on 27 September 1943. V 5706 Ostmark ran aground and sank on 16 March 1941. V 5718 Coburg on 18 November 1943. V 5722 Hornack was sunk at Rørvik, Nord-Trøndelag, Norway by Allied aircraft on 26 October 1944.

59 Vorpostenflotille
59 Vorpostenflotille was formed in February 1941. It was disbanded in June 1945.

V 5901 Bussard
V 5901 Falkland
V 5902 Rabe
V 5902 Polarsonne
V 5903 Elster
V 5903 Polarfront
V 5904 Sperber
V 5904 Polarnacht
V 5905 Habicht
V 5905 Nordriff †
V 5905 Varanger
V 5906 Krähe
V 5906 Nordpol
V 5907 Geier †
V 5907 Südwind
V 5908 Penang †
V 5908 Togo
V 5909 Coronel †
V 5909 Jan Mayen
V 5910 Westwind
V 5911 Gauleiter Bohle
V 5911 Nordkap
V 5912 Köln
V 5912 Polarstern
V 5913 Wilhelm Söhle
V 5913 Polarkreis
V 5914 Vardö
V 5914 Polarmeer
V 5915 Heinrich Baumgarten
V 5916 Yock
V 5917 Othmarschen
V 5918 Jane

† Losses:- V 5905 Nordriff ran aground and was wrecked in Lopphavet on 29 December 1942. V 5908 Penang on 26 January 1944. V 5909 Coronel struck a mine and sank in Varangerfjord on 1 February 1943.

61 Vorpostenflotille
61 Vorpostenflotille was formed in November 1940. It was disbanded in June 1945. A number of vessels were redesignated within the unit.

V 6101 Polarfuchs
V 6101 Nordkap
V 6101 Gauleiter Bohle †
V 6101 Wal 10
V 6102 Köln †
V 6102 Polarstern
V 6102 Wal 11
V 6103 Nordlicht
V 6104 Windhuk
V 6104 Wien
V 6105 Samoa
V 6105 Holstein
V 6106 Kiautschou
V 6106 Tirol †
V 6107 Polarkreis
V 6107 Wilhelm Söhle
V 6107 Franke (V 6110, V 6111)
V 6108 Polarmeer
V 6108 Vardö
V 6109 Nordwind †
V 6110 Nordkyn
V 6112 Friese †
V 6111 Masuren †
V 6112 Gote (V 6113)
V 6113 Alane (V 6114)
V 6114 Duiveland
V 6114 Eismeer
V 6115 Salier
V 6115 Ostwind †
V 6115 Helgoland
V 6116 Ubier †
V 6116 Doggerbank
V 6117 Cherusker †
V 6118 Gallipoli
V 6119 Auk

† Losses:- V 6101 Gauleiter Bohle was bombed and sunk in the Norwegian Sea by Soviet Curtiss Kittyhawk, Ilyushin Il-2 and Yakovlev Yak-9 aircraft on 25 September 1944. V 6106 Tirol was torpedoed and sunk in Varangerfjord by Soviet Navy torpedo boats on 12 December 1943. V 6107 was sunk in Varangerfjord by Soviet aircraft on 17 October 1944. V 6109 Nordwind was torpedoed and sunk in Busse Sound by Soviet aircraft on 23 March 1944. V 6111 Masuren was torpedoed and sunk in Korsfjord by Soviet aircraft on 24 October 1944. V 6113 Gote was torpedoed and sunk in Kongsfjord by Ilyushin Il-4 aircraft of the Soviet Ninth Guards Regiment. V 6116 Ubier and V 6117 Cherusker struck a mine and sank in Porsangerfjord on 6 December 1943.

63 Vorpostenflotille
63 Vorpostenflotille was formed in May 1944. It was disbanded in 1945.

V 6301 Krebs
V 6302 Widder
V 6303 Stier
V 6304 Waage
V 6305 Frauke
V 6306 Orion
V 6307 Mob-FD 2 Jupiter †
V 6308 Mob-FD 1 Saturn
V 6309 Mob-FD 3 Mars
V 6310 Nordkap
V 6311 Polarstern †
V 6312 Polarmeer
V 6313 Westwind
V 6314 Löwe
V 6315 Wal 10
V 6316 Wal 11
V 6321
V 6322
V 6323
V 6324
V 6325
V 6326
V 6327
V 6328 Kormoran
V 6329 Kranich
V 6330
V 6331
V 6332

† Losses:- V 6307 Mob-FD 2 Jupiter was sunk by Soviet aircraft in Norwegian waters on 17 July 1944. V 6311 Polarstern was bombed and sunk in Syltefjord by Soviet aircraft on 22 October 1944.

64 Vorpostenflotille
64 Vorpostenflotille was formed in June 1944. It was disbanded in 1945.

V 6401 Hagen
V 6402 Hersing
V 6403 Hildebrand
V 6404 Midlum
V 6405 Hermann 
V 6406 Hundius
V 6407 Falke
V 6408 Skagerak †
V 6409 Cimber
V 6411 Thor
V 6412 Frigga
V 6413 Fro †
V 6414 Seeschwalbe
V 6415 Kondor
V 6416 Albatros
V 6417 Loki
V 6421
V 6422
V 6423
V 6424
V 6425
V 6426
V 6427
V 6428
V 6429
V 6430
V 6431
V 6432
V 6433
V 6434
V 6435
V 6436
V 6437
V 6438
V 6439
V 6440
V 6441
V 6442
V 6443
V 6444
V 6445
V 6446
V 6447
V 6448
V 6449
V 6450

65 Vorpostenflotille
65 Vorpostenflotille was formed in May 1944. It was disbanded in 1945.

V 6501 Samoa
V 6502 Kiautschou
V 6503 Star 14
V 6504 Claus Ebeling
V 6505 Rau IX
V 6506 Torlyn
V 6507 Othmarschen 
V 6508 Jane
V 6509 Habicht
V 6510 Celle
V 6511 Salier
V 6512 Togo
V 6513 Elster
V 6514 Krähe
V 6515 Hast I
V 6516 KFK123
V 6517 †
V 6521
V 6522
V 6523
V 6524
V 6525
V 6526
V 6527
V 6528
V 6529
V 6530
V 6531
V 6532
V 6533
V 6534
V 6535
V 6541 Drott

† Losses: V 6507 Othmarschen in the Danish Straits on 3 October 1945.

66 Vorpostenflotille
66 Vorpostenflotille was formed in May 1944. It was disbanded in 1945.

V 6601 Friedrich Wilhelm zu Pferde
V 6602 Rother Adler
V 6603 Güldener Löwe
V 6604 Churprinz
V 6605 Markgraf von Hindenburg †
V 6606 Wappen von Hamburg
V 6607 Charlotte Sophie †
V 6608 Steiermark
V 6609 Kärnten
V 6610 Sudetenland
V 6611
V 6612
V 6613
V 6614
V 6615
V 6616
German trawler V 6617V 6617
V 6621 Dorothea
V 6622 Rummelpott

† Losses:- V 6605 Markgraf von Hindenburg on 8 March 1945. V 6607 Charlotte Sophie on 18 June 1945.

67 Vorpostenflotille
67 Vorpostenflotille was formed on 1 July 1944. It was disbanded in 1945.

V 6701 Rotges
V 6702 Windhuk
V 6703
V 6704 †
V 6705
V 6706
V 6707 †
V 6708
V 6709
V 6710
V 6711
V 6712
V 6713
V 6714
V 6715
V 6716
V 6717
V 6718
V 6719 †
V 6720
V 6721
V 6722
V 6723
V 6724
V 6725
V 6726
V 6728 Kormoran
V 6729 Kranich
V 6730 Polarfuchs
V 6731
V 6732
V 6733 Widder †
V 6734 Stier
V 6735 Löwe

† Losses:- V 6704 was scuttled at Vadsø, Finnmark, Norway on 15 October 1944. V 6707 was sunk at Kirkenes, Finnmark by Soviet aircraft on 16 October 1944. V 6719 struck a mine and sank in the Baltic Sea off Swinemünde, Pomerania on 26 September 1944. V 6733 Widder was sunk by Allied aircraft at Horten, Vestfold, Norway on 23 February 1945.

68 Vorpostenflotille
68 Vorpostenflotille was formed in May 1944. It was disbanded in 1945.

V 6801 Viking †
V 6802 Flame
V 6803 Burgunder †
V 6804 Sachse
V 6805 Geuse
V 6806 Alemanne
V 6807 Teutone
V 6808 Rugier
V 6811
V 6812
V 6813
V 6814
V 6815
V 6816

† Losses:- V 6801 Viking was sunk in Ålesund by Bristol Beaufighter aircraft of the Royal Air Force on 17 October 1944. V 6803 Burgunder on 17 August 1944.

7 and 13 Sicherungsflotille
7 Sicherungflotille was formed in February 1943 and was expanded in March 1943. It was disbanded in October 1944 and its vessels transferred to 13 Sicherungflotille, which was disbanded on 24 April 1945.

V 7001 Francis Simone
V 7002 Ste Jeanne d'Arc
V 7003 Petit Jesus
V 7004 St Joseph
V 7005 St Casimir
V 7006 St Louis
V 7007 A la Volonté de Dieux
V 7008 St Raphael
V 7009 St Antonie
V 7010 Volonté de la Vierge Marie
V 7011 Phoque
V 7012 Jeanne et Marie
V 7013 Louise Elise
V 7014 Jesus Nazareth
V 7015 Ste Madeleine
V 7016 Joseph François
V 7017 St Come et Damien
V 7018 St Christophe
V 7019 SG 2
V 7020
V 7021
V 7022

References

Sources

World War II auxiliary ships of Germany
Vorpostenboote